TSRI may refer to 
 Taiwan Semiconductor Research Institute
 The Scripps Research Institute, former name for Scripps Research